Maria Andreyevna Bersneva (born 17 December 1998) is a Russian water polo player. She competed in the 2020 Summer Olympics.

References

1998 births
Living people
People from Zlatoust
Water polo players at the 2020 Summer Olympics
Russian female water polo players
Water polo players at the 2015 European Games
European Games medalists in water polo
European Games gold medalists for Russia
Olympic water polo players of Russia
Sportspeople from Chelyabinsk Oblast
21st-century Russian women